The 75th United States Congress was a meeting of the legislative branch of the United States federal government, composed of the United States Senate and the United States House of Representatives. It met in Washington, D.C., from January 3, 1937, to January 3, 1939, during the fifth and sixth years of Franklin D. Roosevelt's presidency.

The apportionment of seats in the House of Representatives was based on the 1930 United States census.

Both chambers had a Democratic supermajority, with the party increasing their majority in both the House and Senate, and with the reelection of President Roosevelt, maintained an overall federal government trifecta.

This is the most recent Congress to feature a 3/4th majority in the House or Senate by either party.

Major events

 January 20, 1937: President Franklin D. Roosevelt begins his second term.
 February 5, 1937: Roosevelt's court-packing plan proposed
 March 26, 1937: William Henry Hastie becomes the first African-American appointed to a federal judgeship.
 April 12, 1937: National Labor Relations Board v. Jones & Laughlin Steel Corporation: The Supreme Court of the United States ruled the National Labor Relations Act constitutional.
 July 22, 1937: Senate rejects the court-packing plan
 October 5, 1937: Roosevelt delivers the Quarantine Speech

Major legislation

 May 1, 1937: Neutrality Acts of 1937
 June 3, 1937: Agricultural Marketing Agreement Act, ch. 296, 
 August 2, 1937: Marihuana Tax Act of 1937 
 August 5, 1937: National Cancer Institute Act, ch. 565, 
 March 21, 1938: Wheeler–Lea Act, ch. 49, 
 May 24, 1938: La Follette-Bulwinkle Act, ch. 267, 
 June 8, 1938: Foreign Agents Registration Act, ch. 327, 
 June 21, 1938: Natural Gas Act, ch. 556, 
 June 25, 1938: Civil Aeronautics Act, ch. 601, 
 June 25, 1938: Fair Labor Standards Act, ch. 676, 
 June 25, 1938: Federal Food, Drug, and Cosmetic Act, ch. 675, 
 June 25, 1938: Wagner-O'Day Act, ch. 697,

Party summary

Senate

House of Representatives

Leadership

Senate
 President: John N. Garner (D)
 President pro tempore: Key Pittman (D)
 Majority Leader: Joseph Taylor Robinson (D), until July 14, 1937
 Alben W. Barkley (D), from July 14, 1937
 Majority Whip: J. Hamilton Lewis (D)
 Minority Leader: Charles McNary (R)
 Democratic Caucus Secretary: Joshua B. Lee 
 Republican Conference Secretary:  Frederick Hale
 National Senatorial Committee Chairman: John G. Townsend Jr.

House of Representatives
 Speaker: William B. Bankhead (D)
 Majority Leader: Sam Rayburn (D)
 Minority Leader: Bertrand Snell (R)
 Democratic Whip: Patrick J. Boland
 Republican Whip: Harry Lane Englebright
 Democratic Caucus Chairman: Robert L. Doughton
 Republican Conference Chairman: Roy O. Woodruff
 Democratic Campaign Committee Chairman: Patrick H. Drewry
 Republican Campaign Committee Chairman: Joseph W. Martin Jr.

Members

Senate
Senators are popularly elected statewide every two years, with one-third beginning new six-year terms with each Congress. Preceding the names in the list below are Senate class numbers, which indicate the cycle of their election, In this Congress, Class 3 meant their term ended with this Congress, requiring reelection in 1938; Class 1 meant their term began in the last Congress, requiring reelection in 1940; and Class 2 meant their term began in this Congress, requiring reelection in 1942.

Alabama 
 2. John H. Bankhead II (D)
 3. Hugo Black (D), until August 19, 1937
 Dixie Bibb Graves (D), August 20, 1937 - January 10, 1938
 J. Lister Hill (D), from January 11, 1938

Arizona 
 1. Henry F. Ashurst (D)
 3. Carl Hayden (D)

Arkansas 
 2. Joseph Taylor Robinson (D), until July 14, 1937
 John E. Miller (D), from November 15, 1937
 3. Hattie Caraway (D)

California 
 1. Hiram Johnson (R)
 3. William Gibbs McAdoo (D), until November 8, 1938
 Thomas M. Storke (D), from November 9, 1938

Colorado 
 2. Edwin C. Johnson (D)
 3. Alva B. Adams (D)

Connecticut 
 1. Francis T. Maloney (D)
 3. Augustine Lonergan (D)

Delaware 
 1. John G. Townsend Jr. (R)
 2. James H. Hughes (D)

Florida 
 1. Charles O. Andrews (D)
 3. Claude Pepper (D)

Georgia 
 2. Richard Russell Jr. (D)
 3. Walter F. George (D)

Idaho 
 2. William Borah (R)
 3. James P. Pope (D)

Illinois 
 2. J. Hamilton Lewis (D)
 3. William H. Dieterich (D)

Indiana 
 1. Sherman Minton (D)
 3. Frederick Van Nuys (D)

Iowa 
 2. Clyde L. Herring (D)
 3. Guy Gillette (D)

Kansas 
 2. Arthur Capper (R)
 3. George McGill (D)

Kentucky 
 2. M. M. Logan (D)
 3. Alben W. Barkley (D)

Louisiana 
 2. Allen J. Ellender (D)
 3. John H. Overton (D)

Maine 
 1. Frederick Hale (R)
 2. Wallace H. White Jr. (R)

Maryland 
 1. George L. P. Radcliffe (D)
 3. Millard Tydings (D)

Massachusetts 
 1. David I. Walsh (D)
 2. Henry Cabot Lodge Jr. (R)

Michigan 
 1. Arthur H. Vandenberg (R)
 2. Prentiss M. Brown (D)

Minnesota 
 1. Henrik Shipstead (FL)
 2. Ernest Lundeen (FL)

Mississippi 
 1. Theodore G. Bilbo (D)
 2. Pat Harrison (D)

Missouri 
 1. Harry S. Truman (D)
 3. Bennett Champ Clark (D)

Montana 
 1. Burton K. Wheeler (D)
 2. James E. Murray (D)

Nebraska 
 1. Edward R. Burke (D)
 2. George W. Norris (I)

Nevada 
 1. Key Pittman (D)
 3. Pat McCarran (D)

New Hampshire 
 2. Styles Bridges (R)
 3. Fred H. Brown (D)

New Jersey 
 1. A. Harry Moore (D), until January 17, 1938
 John Gerald Milton (D), January 18, 1938 - November 8, 1938
 William Warren Barbour (R), from November 8, 1938
 2. William H. Smathers (D)

New Mexico 
 1. Dennis Chávez (D)
 2. Carl Hatch (D)

New York 
 1. Royal S. Copeland (D), until June 17, 1938
 James M. Mead (D), from December 3, 1938
 3. Robert F. Wagner (D)

North Carolina 
 2. Josiah Bailey (D)
 3. Robert Rice Reynolds (D)

North Dakota 
 1. Lynn Frazier (R-NPL)
 3. Gerald Nye (R)

Ohio 
 1. A. Victor Donahey (D)
 3. Robert J. Bulkley (D)

Oklahoma 
 2. Joshua B. Lee (D)
 3. Elmer Thomas (D)

Oregon 
 2. Charles L. McNary (R)
 3. Frederick Steiwer (R), until January 31, 1938
 Alfred E. Reames (D), February 1, 1938 – November 8, 1938
 Alexander G. Barry (R), from November 9, 1938

Pennsylvania 
 1. Joseph F. Guffey (D)
 3. James J. Davis (R)

Rhode Island 
 1. Peter G. Gerry (D)
 2. Theodore F. Green (D)

South Carolina 
 2. James F. Byrnes (D)
 3. Ellison D. Smith (D)

South Dakota 
 2. William J. Bulow (D)
 3. Herbert E. Hitchcock (D), until November 8, 1938
 Gladys Pyle (R), from November 9, 1938

Tennessee 
 1. Kenneth McKellar (D)
 2. Nathan L. Bachman (D), until April 23, 1937
 George L. Berry (D), May 6, 1937 - November 8, 1938
 Tom Stewart (D), from November 8, 1938

Texas 
 1. Tom Connally (D)
 2. Morris Sheppard (D)

Utah 
 1. William H. King (D)
 3. Elbert D. Thomas (D)

Vermont 
 1. Warren Austin (R)
 3. Ernest Willard Gibson (R)

Virginia 
 1. Harry F. Byrd (D)
 2. Carter Glass (D)

Washington 
 1. Lewis B. Schwellenbach (D)
 3. Homer Bone (D)

West Virginia 
 1. Rush D. Holt Sr. (D)
 2. Matthew M. Neely (D)

Wisconsin 
 1. Robert M. La Follette Jr. (P)
 3. F. Ryan Duffy (D)

Wyoming 
 1. Joseph C. O'Mahoney (D)
 2. Henry H. Schwartz (D)

House of Representatives 
The names of members of the House of Representatives are preceded by their district numbers.

Alabama 
 . Frank W. Boykin (D)
 . J. Lister Hill (D), until January 11, 1938
 George M. Grant (D), from June 14, 1938
 . Henry B. Steagall (D)
 . Sam Hobbs (D)
 . Joe Starnes (D)
 . Pete Jarman (D)
 . William B. Bankhead (D)
 . John J. Sparkman (D)
 . Luther Patrick (D)

Arizona 
  John R. Murdock (D)

Arkansas 
 . William J. Driver (D)
 . John E. Miller (D), until November 14, 1937
 . Claude A. Fuller (D)
 . William B. Cravens (D)
 . David D. Terry (D)
 . John L. McClellan (D)
 . Wade H. Kitchens (D)

California 
 . Clarence F. Lea (D)
 . Harry L. Englebright (R)
 . Frank H. Buck (D)
 . Franck R. Havenner (P)
 . Richard J. Welch (R)
 . Albert E. Carter (R)
 . John H. Tolan (D)
 . John J. McGrath (D)
 . Bertrand W. Gearhart (R)
 . Henry E. Stubbs (D), until February 28, 1937
 Alfred J. Elliott (D), from May 4, 1937
 . John S. McGroarty (D)
 . Jerry Voorhis (D)
 . Charles Kramer (D)
 . Thomas F. Ford (D)
 . John M. Costello (D)
 . John F. Dockweiler (D)
 . Charles J. Colden (D), until April 15, 1938
 . Byron N. Scott (D)
 . Harry R. Sheppard (D)
 . Edouard V. M. Izac (D)

Colorado 
 . Lawrence Lewis (D)
 . Fred N. Cummings (D)
 . John A. Martin (D)
 . Edward T. Taylor (D)

Connecticut 
 . William M. Citron (D)
 . Herman P. Kopplemann (D)
 . William J. Fitzgerald (D)
 . James A. Shanley (D)
 . Alfred N. Phillips (D)
 . J. Joseph Smith (D)

Delaware 
 . William F. Allen (D)

Florida 
 . J. Hardin Peterson (D)
 . Robert A. Green (D)
 . Millard F. Caldwell (D)
 . J. Mark Wilcox (D)
 . Joe Hendricks (D)

Georgia 
 . Hugh Peterson (D)
 . Edward E. Cox (D)
 . Stephen Pace (D)
 . Emmett M. Owen (D)
 . Robert Ramspeck (D)
 . Carl Vinson (D)
 . Malcolm C. Tarver (D)
 . Braswell Deen (D)
 . B. Frank Whelchel (D)
 . Paul Brown (D)

Idaho 
 . Compton I. White (D)
 . D. Worth Clark (D)

Illinois 
 . Edwin V. Champion (D)
 . Lewis M. Long (D)
 . Arthur W. Mitchell (D)
 . Raymond S. McKeough (D)
 . Edward A. Kelly (D)
 . Harry P. Beam (D)
 . Adolph J. Sabath (D)
 . Thomas J. O’Brien (D)
 . Leonard W. Schuetz (D)
 . Leo Kocialkowski (D)
 . James McAndrews (D)
 . Ralph E. Church (R)
 . Chauncey W. Reed (R)
 . Noah M. Mason (R)
 . Leo E. Allen (R)
 . Chester C. Thompson (D)
 . Lewis L. Boyer (D)
 . Everett M. Dirksen (R)
 . Leslie C. Arends (R)
 . James A. Meeks (D)
 . Hugh M. Rigney (D)
 . Scott W. Lucas (D)
 . Frank W. Fries (D)
 . Edwin M. Schaefer (D)
 . Laurence F. Arnold (D)
 . Claude V. Parsons (D)
 . Kent E. Keller (D)

Indiana 
 . William T. Schulte (D)
 . Charles A. Halleck (R)
 . Samuel B. Pettengill (D)
 . James I. Farley (D)
 . Glenn Griswold (D)
 . Virginia E. Jenckes (D)
 . Arthur H. Greenwood (D)
 . John W. Boehne Jr. (D)
 . Eugene B. Crowe (D)
 . Finly H. Gray (D)
 . William H. Larrabee (D)
 . Louis Ludlow (D)

Iowa 
 . Edward C. Eicher (D), until December 2, 1938
 . William S. Jacobsen (D)
 . John W. Gwynne (R)
 . Fred Biermann (D)
 . Lloyd Thurston (R)
 . Cassius C. Dowell (R)
 . Otha D. Wearin (D)
 . Fred C. Gilchrist (R)
 . Vincent F. Harrington (D)

Kansas 
 . William P. Lambertson (R)
 . U. S. Guyer (R)
 . Edward White Patterson (D)
 . Edward Herbert Rees (R)
 . John Mills Houston (D)
 . Frank Carlson (R)
 . Clifford R. Hope (R)

Kentucky 
 . Noble J. Gregory (D)
 . Beverly M. Vincent (D)
 . Emmet O'Neal (D)
 . Edward W. Creal (D)
 . Brent Spence (D)
 . Virgil Chapman (D)
 . Andrew J. May (D)
 . Fred M. Vinson (D), until May 12, 1938
 Joe B. Bates (D), from June 4, 1938
 . John M. Robsion (R)

Louisiana 
 . Joachim O. Fernandez (D)
 . Paul H. Maloney (D)
 . Robert L. Mouton (D)
 . Overton Brooks (D)
 . Newt V. Mills (D)
 . John K. Griffith (D)
 . René L. DeRouen (D)
 . A. Leonard Allen (D)

Maine 
 . James C. Oliver (R)
 . Clyde H. Smith (R)
 . Ralph Owen Brewster (R)

Maryland 
 . T. Alan Goldsborough (D)
 . William P. Cole Jr. (D)
 . Vincent L. Palmisano (D)
 . Ambrose J. Kennedy (D)
 . Stephen W. Gambrill (D), until December 19, 1938
 . David J. Lewis (D)

Massachusetts 
 . Allen T. Treadway (R)
 . Charles Clason (R)
 . Joseph E. Casey (D)
 . Pehr G. Holmes (R)
 . Edith Nourse Rogers (R)
 . George J. Bates (R)
 . William P. Connery Jr. (D), until June 15, 1937
 Lawrence J. Connery (D), from September 28, 1937
 . Arthur D. Healey (D)
 . Robert Luce (R)
 . George H. Tinkham (R)
 . John P. Higgins (D), until September 30, 1937
 Thomas A. Flaherty (D), from December 14, 1937
 . John W. McCormack (D)
 . Richard B. Wigglesworth (R)
 . Joseph W. Martin Jr. (R)
 . Charles L. Gifford (R)

Michigan 
 . George G. Sadowski (D)
 . Earl C. Michener (R)
 . Paul W. Shafer (R)
 . Clare E. Hoffman (R)
 . Carl E. Mapes (R)
 . Andrew J. Transue (D)
 . Jesse P. Wolcott (R)
 . Fred L. Crawford (R)
 . Albert J. Engel (R)
 . Roy O. Woodruff (R)
 . John F. Luecke (D)
 . Frank Hook (D)
 . George D. O'Brien (D)
 . Louis C. Rabaut (D)
 . John D. Dingell Sr. (D)
 . John Lesinski Sr. (D)
 . George A. Dondero (R)

Minnesota 
 . August H. Andresen (R)
 . Elmer Ryan (D)
 . Henry Teigan (FL)
 . Melvin Maas (R)
 . Dewey Johnson (FL)
 . Harold Knutson (R)
 . Paul John Kvale (FL)
 . John Bernard (FL)
 . Rich T. Buckler (FL)

Mississippi 
 . John E. Rankin (D)
 . Wall Doxey (D)
 . William M. Whittington (D)
 . Aaron L. Ford (D)
 . Ross A. Collins (D)
 . William M. Colmer (D)
 . Dan R. McGehee (D)

Missouri 
 . Milton A. Romjue (D)
 . William L. Nelson (D)
 . Richard M. Duncan (D)
 . C. Jasper Bell (D)
 . Joseph B. Shannon (D)
 . Reuben T. Wood (D)
 . Dewey Short (R)
 . Clyde Williams (D)
 . Clarence Cannon (D)
 . Orville Zimmerman (D)
 . Thomas C. Hennings Jr. (D)
 . Charles Arthur Anderson (D)
 . John J. Cochran (D)

Montana 
 . Jerry J. O'Connell (D)
 . James F. O'Connor (D)

Nebraska 
 . Henry Carl Luckey (D)
 . Charles F. McLaughlin (D)
 . Karl Stefan (R)
 . Charles Gustav Binderup (D)
 . Harry B. Coffee (D)

Nevada 
 . James G. Scrugham (D)

New Hampshire 
 . Arthur B. Jenks (R), until June 9, 1938
 Alphonse Roy (D), from June 9, 1938
 . Charles W. Tobey (R)

New Jersey 
 . Charles A. Wolverton (R)
 . Elmer H. Wene (D)
 . William H. Sutphin (D)
 . D. Lane Powers (R)
 . Charles A. Eaton (R)
 . Donald H. McLean (R)
 . J. Parnell Thomas (R)
 . George N. Seger (R)
 . Edward A. Kenney (D), until January 27, 1938
 . Fred A. Hartley Jr. (R)
 . Edward L. O'Neill (D)
 . Frank William Towey Jr. (D)
 . Mary T. Norton (D)
 . Edward J. Hart (D)

New Mexico 
 . John J. Dempsey (D)

New York 
 . Matthew J. Merritt (D)
 . Caroline O'Day (D)
 . Robert L. Bacon (R), until September 12, 1938
 . William B. Barry (D)
 . Joseph L. Pfeifer (D)
 . Thomas H. Cullen (D)
 . Marcellus H. Evans (D)
 . Andrew L. Somers (D)
 . John J. Delaney (D)
 . Donald L. O'Toole (D)
 . Eugene J. Keogh (D)
 . Emanuel Celler (D)
 . James A. O'Leary (D)
 . Samuel Dickstein (D)
 . Christopher D. Sullivan (D)
 . William I. Sirovich (D)
 . John J. Boylan (D), until October 5, 1938
 . John J. O'Connor (D)
 . Theodore A. Peyser (D), until August 8, 1937
 Bruce F. Barton (R), from November 2, 1937
 . Martin J. Kennedy (D)
 . Sol Bloom (D)
 . James J. Lanzetta (D)
 . Joseph A. Gavagan (D)
 . Edward W. Curley (D)
 . Charles A. Buckley (D)
 . James M. Fitzpatrick (D)
 . Charles D. Millard (R), until September 29, 1937
 Ralph A. Gamble (R), from November 2, 1937
 . Hamilton Fish Jr. (R)
 . Philip A. Goodwin (R), until June 6, 1937
 Lewis K. Rockefeller (R), from November 2, 1937
 . William T. Byrne (D)
 . E. Harold Cluett (R)
 . Frank Crowther (R)
 . Bertrand H. Snell (R)
 . Francis D. Culkin (R)
 . Fred J. Douglas (R)
 . Bert Lord (R)
 . Clarence E. Hancock (R)
 . John Taber (R)
 . W. Sterling Cole (R)
 . George B. Kelly (D)
 . James W. Wadsworth Jr. (R)
 . Walter G. Andrews (R)
 . Alfred F. Beiter (D)
 . James M. Mead (D), until December 2, 1938
 . Daniel A. Reed (R)

North Carolina 
 . Lindsay C. Warren (D)
 . John H. Kerr (D)
 . Graham A. Barden (D)
 . Harold D. Cooley (D)
 . Franklin Wills Hancock Jr. (D)
 . William B. Umstead (D)
 . J. Bayard Clark (D)
 . J. Walter Lambeth (D)
 . Robert L. Doughton (D)
 . Alfred L. Bulwinkle (D)
 . Zebulon Weaver (D)

North Dakota 
 . William Lemke (R-NPL)
 . Usher L. Burdick (R-NPL)

Ohio 
 . John McSweeney (D)
 . Harold G. Mosier (D)
 . Joseph A. Dixon (D)
 . Herbert S. Bigelow (D)
 . Byron B. Harlan (D)
 . Frank Le Blond Kloeb (D), until August 19, 1937
 Walter H. Albaugh (R), from November 8, 1938
 . Frank C. Kniffin (D)
 . James G. Polk (D)
 . Arthur W. Aleshire (D)
 . Thomas B. Fletcher (D)
 . John F. Hunter (D)
 . Thomas A. Jenkins (R)
 . Harold K. Claypool (D)
 . Arthur P. Lamneck (D)
 . Dudley A. White (R)
 . Dow W. Harter (D)
 . Robert T. Secrest (D)
 . William R. Thom (D)
 . William A. Ashbrook (D)
 . Lawrence E. Imhoff (D)
 . Michael J. Kirwan (D)
 . Martin L. Sweeney (D)
 . Robert Crosser (D)
 . Anthony A. Fleger (D)

Oklahoma 
 . Will Rogers (D)
 . Wesley E. Disney (D)
 . John Conover Nichols (D)
 . Wilburn Cartwright (D)
 . Lyle Boren (D)
 . Robert Potter Hill (D), until October 29, 1937
 Gomer Griffith Smith (D), from December 10, 1937
 . Jed Johnson (D)
 . Sam C. Massingale (D)
 . Phil Ferguson (D)

Oregon 
 . James W. Mott (R)
 . Walter M. Pierce (D)
 . Nan Wood Honeyman (D)

Pennsylvania 
 . Leon Sacks (D)
 . James P. McGranery (D)
 . Michael J. Bradley (D)
 . J. Burrwood Daly (D)
 . Frank J.G. Dorsey (D)
 . Michael J. Stack (D)
 . Ira W. Drew (D)
 . James Wolfenden (R)
 . Oliver Walter Frey (D)
 . J. Roland Kinzer (R)
 . Patrick J. Boland (D)
 . J. Harold Flannery (D)
 . James H. Gildea (D)
 . Guy L. Moser (D)
 . Albert G. Rutherford (R)
 . Robert F. Rich (R)
 . J. William Ditter (R)
 . Benjamin Kurtz Focht (R), until March 27, 1937
 Richard M. Simpson (R), from May 11, 1937
 . Guy J. Swope (D)
 . Benjamin Jarrett (R)
 . Francis E. Walter (D)
 . Harry L. Haines (D)
 . Don Gingery (D)
 . J. Buell Snyder (D)
 . Charles I. Faddis (D)
 . Charles R. Eckert (D)
 . Joseph Gray (D)
 . Robert G. Allen (D)
 . Charles N. Crosby (D)
 . Peter J. De Muth (D)
 . James L. Quinn (D)
 . Herman P. Eberharter (D)
 . Henry Ellenbogen (D), until January 3, 1938
 . Matthew A. Dunn (D)

Rhode Island 
 . Aime Forand (D)
 . John M. O'Connell (D)

South Carolina 
 . Thomas S. McMillan (D)
 . Hampton P. Fulmer (D)
 . John C. Taylor (D)
 . Gabriel H. Mahon Jr. (D)
 . James P. Richards (D)
 . Allard H. Gasque (D), until June 17, 1938
 Elizabeth Hawley Gasque (D), from September 13, 1938

South Dakota 
 . Fred H. Hildebrandt (D)
 . Francis Case (R)

Tennessee 
 . B. Carroll Reece (R)
 . J. Will Taylor (R)
 . Sam D. McReynolds (D)
 . John Ridley Mitchell (D)
 . Richard Merrill Atkinson (D)
 . Clarence W. Turner (D)
 . Herron C. Pearson (D)
 . Jere Cooper (D)
 . Walter Chandler (D)

Texas 
 . Wright Patman (D)
 . Martin Dies Jr. (D)
 . Morgan G. Sanders (D)
 . Sam Rayburn (D)
 . Hatton W. Sumners (D)
 . Luther A. Johnson (D)
 . Nat Patton (D)
 . Albert Thomas (D)
 . Joseph J. Mansfield (D)
 . James P. Buchanan (D), until February 22, 1937
 Lyndon B. Johnson (D), from April 10, 1937
 . William R. Poage (D)
 . Fritz G. Lanham (D)
 . William D. McFarlane (D)
 . Richard M. Kleberg (D)
 . Milton H. West (D)
 . R. Ewing Thomason (D)
 . Clyde L. Garrett (D)
 . Marvin Jones (D)
 . George H. Mahon (D)
 . Maury Maverick (D)
 . Charles L. South (D)

Utah 
 . Abe Murdock (D)
 . J. W. Robinson (D)

Vermont 
 . Charles A. Plumley (R)

Virginia 
 . S. Otis Bland (D)
 . Norman R. Hamilton (D)
 . Andrew J. Montague (D), until January 24, 1937
 Dave E. Satterfield Jr. (D), from November 2, 1937
 . Patrick H. Drewry (D)
 . Thomas G. Burch (D)
 . Clifton A. Woodrum (D)
 . A. Willis Robertson (D)
 . Howard W. Smith (D)
 . John W. Flannagan Jr. (D)

Washington 
 . Warren G. Magnuson (D)
 . Monrad C. Wallgren (D)
 . Martin F. Smith (D)
 . Knute Hill (D)
 . Charles H. Leavy (D)
 . John M. Coffee (D)

West Virginia 
 . Robert L. Ramsay (D)
 . Jennings Randolph (D)
 . Andrew Edmiston Jr. (D)
 . George William Johnson (D)
 . John Kee (D)
 . Joe L. Smith (D)

Wisconsin 
 . Thomas Ryum Amlie (P)
 . Harry Sauthoff (P)
 . Gardner R. Withrow (P)
 . Randolph Joseph Cannon (D)
 . Thomas David Patrick O'Malley (D)
 . Michael K. Reilly (D)
 . Gerald J. Boileau (P)
 . George J. Schneider (P)
 . Merlin Hull (P)
 . Bernard J. Gehrmann (P)

Wyoming 
 . Paul Ranous Greever (D)

Non-voting members 
 . Anthony J. Dimond (D)
 . Samuel Wilder King (R)
 . Quintin Paredes (Resident Commissioner) (Nac.), until September 29, 1938
 Joaquin Miguel Elizalde (Resident Commissioner) (Nac.), from September 29, 1938
 . Santiago Iglesias Pantín (Resident Commissioner) (Coalitionist)

Changes in membership
The count below reflects changes from the beginning of this Congress.

Senate

|-
| Tennessee(2)
| nowrap  | Nathan L. Bachman (D)
| Died April 23, 1937.Successor appointed to continue the term.
| nowrap  | George L. Berry (D)
| May 6, 1937

|-
| Arkansas(2)
| nowrap  | Joseph T. Robinson (D)
| Died July 14, 1937.Successor elected October 19, 1937.
| nowrap  | John E. Miller (D)
| November 15, 1937

|-
| Alabama(3)
| nowrap  | Hugo Black (D)
| Resigned August 19, 1937, after being appointed Associate Justice of the Supreme Court of the United States.Successor appointed to continue the term.
| nowrap  | Dixie Bibb Graves (D)
| August 20, 1937

|-
| Alabama(3)
| nowrap  | Dixie Bibb Graves (D)
| Resigned January 10, 1938, after successor elected.
| nowrap  | J. Lister Hill (D)
| January 11, 1938

|-
| New Jersey(1)
| nowrap  | A. Harry Moore (D)
| Resigned January 17, 1938, after being elected Governor of New Jersey.Successor appointed to continue the term.
| nowrap  | John G. Milton (D)
| January 18, 1938

|-
| Oregon(3)
| nowrap  | Frederick Steiwer (R)
| Resigned January 31, 1938, due to poor health.Successor appointed to continue the term.
| nowrap  | Alfred E. Reames (D)
| February 1, 1938

|-
| New York(1)
| nowrap  | Royal S. Copeland (D)
| Died June 17, 1938.Successor elected November 8, 1938.
| nowrap  | James M. Mead (D)
| December 3, 1938

|-
| California(3)
| nowrap  | William G. McAdoo (D)
| Resigned November 8, 1938, after losing nomination for upcoming term.Successor appointed to continue the term.
| nowrap  | Thomas M. Storke (D)
| November 9, 1938

|-
| New Jersey(1)
| nowrap  | John G. Milton (D)
| Interim appointee retired when successor elected.Successor elected November 8, 1938.
| nowrap  | William W. Barbour (R)
| November 9, 1938

|-
| Oregon(3)
| nowrap  | Alfred E. Reames (D)
| Interim appointee retired when successor elected.Successor elected November 8, 1938.
| nowrap  | Alexander G. Barry (R)
| November 9, 1938

|-
| South Dakota(3)
| nowrap  | Herbert E. Hitchcock (D)
| Interim appointee lost nomination to finish the term.Successor elected November 8, 1938.
| nowrap  | Gladys Pyle (R)
| November 9, 1938

|-
| Tennessee(2)
| nowrap  | George L. Berry (D)
| Interim appointee lost nomination to finish the term.Successor elected November 8, 1938.
| nowrap  | Tom Stewart (D)
| November 9, 1938.

|}

House of Representatives

|-
| 
|  | Andrew Jackson Montague (D)
| Died January 24, 1937.
|  | Dave E. Satterfield Jr. (D)
| November 2, 1937

|-
| 
|  | James P. Buchanan (D)
| Died February 22, 1937.
|  | Lyndon B. Johnson (D)
| April 10, 1937

|-
| 
|  | Henry E. Stubbs (D)
| Died February 28, 1937.
|  | Alfred J. Elliott (D)
| May 4, 1937

|-
| 
|  | Benjamin K. Focht (R)
| Died March 27, 1937.
|  | Richard M. Simpson (R)
| May 11, 1937

|-
| 
|  | Philip A. Goodwin (R)
| Died June 6, 1937.
|  | Lewis K. Rockefeller (R)
| November 2, 1937

|-
| 
|  | William P. Connery Jr. (D)
| Died June 15, 1937.
|  | Lawrence J. Connery (D)
| September 28, 1937

|-
| 
|  | Theodore A. Peyser (D)
| Died August 8, 1937.
|  | Bruce F. Barton (R)
| November 2, 1937

|-
| 
|  | Frank Le Blond Kloeb (D)
| Resigned August 19, 1937, to become justice of United States District Court for the Northern District of Ohio.
|  | Walter H. Albaugh (R)
| November 8, 1938

|-
| 
|  | Charles D. Millard (R)
| Resigned September 29, 1937, to become surrogate of Westchester County, New York.
|  | Ralph A. Gamble (R)
| November 2, 1937

|-
| 
|  | John P. Higgins (D)
| Resigned September 30, 1937, to become chief justice of the Massachusetts Superior Court.
|  | Thomas A. Flaherty (D)
| December 14, 1937

|-
| 
|  | Robert P. Hill (D)
| Died October 29, 1937.
|  | Gomer Griffith Smith (D)
| December 10, 1937

|-
| 
|  | John E. Miller (D)
| Resigned November 14, 1937, to become U.S. senator.
| colspan=2 | Vacant until the next Congress

|-
| 
|  | Henry Ellenbogen (D)
| Resigned January 3, 1938, to become judge of Common Pleas of Allegheny County, Pennsylvania.
| colspan=2 | Vacant until the next Congress

|-
| 
|  | J. Lister Hill (D)
| Resigned January 11, 1938, to become U.S. senator.
|  | George M. Grant (D)
| June 14, 1938

|-
| 
|  | Edward A. Kenney (D)
| Died January 27, 1938.
| colspan=2 | Vacant until the next Congress

|-
| 
|  | Charles J. Colden (D)
| Died April 15, 1938.
| colspan=2 | Vacant until the next Congress

|-
| 
|  | Fred M. Vinson (D)
| Resigned May 27, 1938, to become associate justice of the United States Court of Appeals for the District of Columbia Circuit.
|  | Joe B. Bates (D)
| June 4, 1938

|-
| 
|  | Arthur B. Jenks (R)
| Lost contested election June 9, 1938
|  | Alphonse Roy (D)
| June 9, 1938

|-
| 
|  | Allard H. Gasque (D)
| Died June 17, 1938.
|  | Elizabeth Hawley Gasque (D)
| September 13, 1937

|-
| 
|  | Robert L. Bacon (R)
| Died September 12, 1938.
| colspan=2 | Vacant until the next Congress

|-
| 
| bgcolor= | Quintin Paredes (NAC)
| Resigned September 29, 1938.
| Joaquín Miguel Elizalde (NAC)
| September 29, 1938

|-
| 
|  | John J. Boylan (D)
| Died October 5, 1938.
| colspan=2 | Vacant until the next Congress

|-
| 
|  | Edward C. Eicher (D)
| Resigned December 2, 1938, to become commissioner to the Securities and Exchange Commission.
| colspan=2 | Vacant until the next Congress

|-
| 
|  | James M. Mead (D)
| Resigned December 2, 1938, after being elected to the U.S. Senate.
| colspan=2 | Vacant until the next Congress

|-
| 
|  | Stephen W. Gambrill (D)
| Died December 19, 1938.
| colspan=2 | Vacant until the next Congress

|}

Committees

Senate

 Agriculture and Forestry (Chairman: Ellison D. Smith; Ranking Member: George W. Norris)
 Aquatic Life (Special)
 Appropriations (Chairman: Carter Glass; Ranking Member: Frederick Hale)
 Audit and Control the Contingent Expenses of the Senate (Chairman: James F. Byrnes; Ranking Member: John G. Townsend Jr.)
 Banking and Currency (Chairman: Robert F. Wagner; Ranking Member: John G. Townsend Jr.)
 Campaign Expenditures Investigation (Special) (Chairman: Augustine Lonergan)
 Civil Service (Chairman: William J. Bulow; Ranking Member: Wallace H. White Jr.)
 Civil Service Laws (Special)
 Civil Service System (Special)
 Claims (Chairman: Josiah W. Bailey; Ranking Member: Arthur Capper)
 Commerce (Chairman: Royal S. Copeland; Ranking Member: Charles L. McNary)
 Court Reorganization and Judicial Procedure (Special)
 District of Columbia (Chairman: William H. King; Ranking Member: Arthur Capper)
 Education and Labor  (Chairman: Elbert D. Thomas; Ranking Member: William E. Borah)
 Investigation Violations of Free Speech and the Rights of Labor
 Enrolled Bills (Chairman: Hattie W. Caraway; Ranking Member: Arthur H. Vandenberg)
 Executive Agencies of the Government (Select)
 Expenditures in Executive Departments (Chairman: J. Hamilton Lewis; Ranking Member: James J. Davis)
 Finance (Chairman: Pat Harrison; Ranking Member: Robert M. La Follette Jr.)
 Foreign Relations (Chairman: Key Pittman; Ranking Member: William E. Borah)
 Government Organization (Select)
 Immigration (Chairman: Richard B. Russell; Ranking Member: Hiram W. Johnson)
 Indian Affairs (Chairman: Elmer Thomas; Ranking Member: Lynn J. Frazier)
 Insular Affairs (Chairman: Leo Kocialkowski; Ranking Member: N/A)
 Interoceanic Canals (Chairman: N/A; Ranking Member: N/A)
 Interstate Commerce (Chairman: Burton K. Wheeler; Ranking Member: Wallace H. White Jr.) 
 Irrigation and Reclamation (Chairman: John H. Bankhead II; Ranking Member: Charles L. McNary)
 Judiciary (Chairman: Henry F. Ashurst; Ranking Member: William E. Borah)
 Library (Chairman: Alben W. Barkley; Ranking Member: Ernest W. Gibson)
 Lobbying Activities (Select)
 Manufactures (Chairman: Robert J. Bulkley; Ranking Member: Robert M. La Follette Jr.)
 Military Affairs (Chairman: Morris Sheppard; Ranking Member: Warren R. Austin)
 Mines and Mining (Chairman: M.M. Logan; Ranking Member: Lynn J. Frazier)
 Mississippi Flood Control Project (Select) (Chairman: Robert F. Wagner)
 Merchant Marine (Special)
 Naval Affairs (Chairman: David I. Walsh; Ranking Member: Frederick Hale)
 Patents (Chairman: William Gibbs McAdoo; Ranking Member: George W. Norris)
 Pensions (Chairman: George McGill; Ranking Member: Lynn J. Frazier)
 Post Office and Post Roads (Chairman: Kenneth McKellar; Ranking Member: Lynn J. Frazier)
 Printing (Chairman: J. Walter Lambeth; Ranking Member: Arthur H. Vandenberg)
 Privileges and Elections (Chairman: Walter F. George; Ranking Member: Warren R. Austin)
 Public Buildings and Grounds (Chairman: Tom Connally; Ranking Member: Warren R. Austin)
 Public Lands and Surveys (Chairman: Alva B. Adams; Ranking Member: Gerald P. Nye)
 Rules (Chairman: Matthew M. Neely; Ranking Member: Frederick Hale)
 Senatorial Campaign Expenditures (Special)
 Taxation of Government Securities and Salaries (Special)
 Territories and Insular Affairs (Chairman: Millard E. Tydings; Ranking Member: Gerald P. Nye)
 Unemployment and Relief (Select)
 Whole
 Wildlife Resources (Special) (Chairman: Vacant; Ranking Member: Key Pittman)
 Wool Production (Special) (Chairman: Alva B. Adams)

House of Representatives

 Accounts (Chairman: Lindsay C. Warren; Ranking Member: James Wolfenden)
 Agriculture (Chairman: J. Marvin Jones; Ranking Member: Clifford R. Hope)
 Appropriations (Chairman: Edward T. Taylor; Ranking Member: John Taber)
 Banking and Currency (Chairman: Henry B. Steagall; Ranking Member: Jesse P. Wolcott)
 Census (Chairman: William H. Larrabee; Ranking Member: J. Roland Kinzer)
 Civil Service (Chairman: Robert Ramspeck; Ranking Member: Edith Nourse Rogers)
 Claims (Chairman: Ambrose J. Kennedy; Ranking Member: Ulysses S. Guyer)
 Coinage, Weights and Measures (Chairman: Andrew Somers; Ranking Member: Lloyd Thurston)
 Conservation of Wildlife Resources (Select) (Chairman: A. Willis Robertson)
 Disposition of Executive Papers (Chairman: Charles J. Colden; Ranking Member: Bertrand W. Gearhart)
 District of Columbia (Chairman: Vincent L. Palmisano; Ranking Member: Everett M. Dirksen)
 Education (Chairman: William H. Larrabee; Ranking Member: Albert E. Carter)
 Election of the President, Vice President and Representatives in Congress (Chairman: Caroline O'Day; Ranking Member: George H. Tinkham)
 Elections No.#1 (Chairman: N/A; Ranking Member: Clarence E. Hancock)
 Elections No.#2 (Chairman: Joseph H. Gavagan; Ranking Member: Ulysses S. Guyer)
 Elections No.#3 (Chairman: John H. Kerr; Ranking Member: Charles L. Gifford)
 Enrolled Bills (Chairman: Claude V. Parsons; Ranking Member: Charles Aubrey Eaton)
 Expenditures in the Executive Departments (Chairman: John J. Cochran; Ranking Member: Charles L. Gifford)
 Flood Control (Chairman: William M. Whittington; Ranking Member: Robert F. Rich)
 Foreign Affairs (Chairman: Sam D. McReynolds; Ranking Member: Hamilton Fish III)
 Government Organization (Select) (Chairman: N/A)
 Immigration and Naturalization (Chairman: Samuel Dickstein; Ranking Member: J. Will Taylor)
 Indian Affairs (Chairman: Will Rogers; Ranking Member: Fred C. Gilchrist)
 Insular Affairs (Chairman: Leo Kocialkowski; Ranking Member: Lloyd Thurston)
 Interstate and Foreign Commerce (Chairman: Clarence F. Lea; Ranking Member: Carl E. Mapes)
 Invalid Pensions (Chairman: John Lesinski; Ranking Member: Charles D. Millard)
 Investigate Real Estate Beholder's Reorganizations (Select) (Chairman: N/A)
 Irrigation and Reclamation (Chairman: Compton I. White; Ranking Member: Fred A. Hartley Jr.)
 Judiciary (Chairman: Hatton W. Sumners; Ranking Member: Ulysses S. Guyer)
 Labor (Chairman: Mary Teresa Norton; Ranking Member: Richard J. Welch)
 Library (Chairman: Kent E. Keller; Ranking Member: Allen T. Treadway)
 Memorials (Chairman: Pete Jarman; Ranking Member: Frank Crowther)
 Merchant Marine and Fisheries (Chairman: S. Otis Bland; Ranking Member: Richard J. Welch)
 Military Affairs (Chairman: Andrew J. May; Ranking Member: Walter G. Andrews)
 Mines and Mining (Chairman: Joe L. Smith; Ranking Member: Harry Lane Englebright)
 Naval Affairs (Chairman: Carl Vinson; Ranking Member: Charles D. Millard)
 Patents (Chairman: William I. Sirovich; Ranking Member: Fred A. Hartley Jr.)
 Pensions (Chairman: Allard H. Gasque; Ranking Member: Walter G. Andrews)
 Post Office and Post Roads (Chairman: James M. Mead; Ranking Member: Fred A. Hartley Jr.)
 Printing (Chairman: J. Walter Lambeth; Ranking Member: Robert F. Rich)
 Public Buildings and Grounds (Chairman: Fritz G. Lanham; Ranking Member: J. Will Taylor)
 Public Lands (Chairman: René L. De Rouen; Ranking Member: Harry Lane Englebright)
 Revision of Laws (Chairman: Raymond J. Cannon; Ranking Member: Jesse P. Wolcott)
 Rivers and Harbors (Chairman: Joseph J. Mansfield; Ranking Member: George N. Seger)
 Roads (Chairman: Wilburn Cartwright; Ranking Member: Jesse P. Wolcott)
 Rules (Chairman: John J. O'Connor; Ranking Member: Joseph W. Martin Jr.)
 Standards of Official Conduct
 Territories (Chairman: Robert A. Green; Ranking Member: Harry Lane Englebright)
 War Claims (Chairman: Alfred Beiter; Ranking Member: Benjamin K. Focht)
 Ways and Means (Chairman: Robert L. Doughton; Ranking Member: Allen T. Treadway)
 World War Veterans' Legislation (Chairman: John E. Rankin; Ranking Member: Edith Nourse Rogers)
 Whole

Joint committees

 Conditions of Indian Tribes (Special)
 Disposition of (Useless) Executive Papers
 Forestry (Chairman: Sen. John H. Bankhead II)
 Government Organization
 Hawaii
 The Library (Chairman: Sen. Alben W. Barkley)
 To Investigate Phosphate Resource of the United States
 Printing (Chairman: Sen. Carl Hayden; Vice Chairman: Rep. J. Walter Lambeth)
 Taxation (Chairman: Sen. Pat Harrison; Vice Chairman: Rep. Robert L. Doughton)
 Tax Evasion and Avoidance
 Tennessee Valley Authority

Caucuses
 Democratic (House)
 Democratic (Senate)

Employees

Legislative branch agency directors
Architect of the Capitol: David Lynn
Attending Physician of the United States Congress: George Calver
Librarian of Congress: Herbert Putnam 
Public Printer of the United States: Augustus E. Giegengack

Senate
Chaplain: Reverend ZeBarney Thorne Phillips (Episcopalian)
Parliamentarian: Charles L. Watkins
Secretary: Edwin Alexander Halsey
Librarian: Ruskin McArdle
Sergeant at Arms: Chesley W. Jurney
Democratic Party Secretary: Leslie Biffle
Republican Party Secretary: Carl A. Loeffler

House of Representatives
Chaplain: James Shera Montgomery (Methodist)
Clerk: South Trimble
Doorkeeper: Joseph J. Sinnott
Parliamentarian: Lewis Deschler
Postmaster: Finis E. Scott
Reading Clerks: Roger M. Calloway (D) and Alney E. Chaffee (R)
Sergeant at Arms: Kenneth Romney

See also 
 1936 United States elections (elections leading to this Congress)
 1936 United States presidential election
 1936 United States Senate elections
 1936 United States House of Representatives elections
 1938 United States elections (elections during this Congress, leading to the next Congress)
 1938 United States Senate elections
 1938 United States House of Representatives elections

Notes

References